Jean McClain (born March 8, 1953), better known as Pepper Mashay, is an American soul, house and dance music singer-songwriter who has had success as a touring and studio performer.

Early life
McClain grew up in Muncie, Indiana. Growing up, her musical influences were Janis Joplin, Joni Mitchell and Bob Dylan. She left Indiana in her twenties to pursue her career.

Career
Mashay was contracted to sing back-up for the soundtrack of Tina Turner's movie What's Love Got to Do with It. She spent two days with Tina Turner saying, "She is rock n' roll".

In 1995, Mashay's manager at the time contacted Michael O'Hara to work on an initial demo for a possible recording deal. They wrote five songs together in her California home, but the songs never went anywhere. Mashay ended up writing a song called "Something to Feel" and it got picked up by Island Records. In her thirties, music labels in the '90s thought she was too old for a record deal but she never gave up.

Mashay has an extensive résumé of work as a background and session singer working, most notably, with Gladys Horton in a 1980s regrouping of The Marvelettes. Mashay's photo can be seen on the cover of the CD The Marvelettes: The Very Best of the Motor City Recordings.

As a lead vocalist, Mashay has released many tracks that have performed well on the U.S. Hot Dance Club Play chart and the Hot Dance Airplay chart. Those singles include "Something to Feel" (1995), "Happiness" (1997), "Step into My Life" (1998), "Sextacy" (2000) and "Send Me an Angel" (2005).  Her voice is probably best known from the "Let's get soaking wet!" chanting throughout the Barry Harris track "Dive in the Pool", made famous by its inclusion in the American television series Queer as Folk.  Another collaboration with Harris, "I Got My Pride", hit number two on the U.S. Hot Dance Music/Club Play chart in 2001. In late 2006, Pepper Mashay earned her first solo chart-topper on the U.S. Hot Dance Music/Club Play chart with the song "Lost Yo Mind".  It has attained moderate to heavy rotation on dance-oriented radio stations, charting well on the Hot Dance Airplay. Mashay issued her single, "Got to Give the People What They Want" in late January 2008 and "Does Your Mamma Know" during the fourth quarter of 2008. She toured with House's Hugh Laurie officially as part of his band, Hugh Laurie & The Copper Bottom Band.

Mashay also performs as Sista Jean & CB, has released two albums under that name. The first was the 2013 release Back to the Root. Next was the 2015 album Requiem for a Heavy Weight, a tribute to Odetta, an icon in the folk & blues genre.

Discography

Singles
 1995: "Something to Feel"
 1995: "By Any Means Necessary" (with Lenny White)
 1997: "Happiness"
 1997: "Not Much Heaven"
 1998: "Into You"
 1998: "Right Back to Love" (with Subsystem)
 1998: "Step 2 Me" (Grant Nelson feat. Jean McClain) - (UK #92, UK Dance #7)
 1998: "Step into My Life"
 1998: "You've Got to Go" (with DJ Alexia)
 2000: "Sextacy"
 2000: "Here's to Life"
 2000: "Dive in the Pool" (with Barry Harris)
 2001: "Love Pretender" (with Frank 'O Moiraghi)
 2001: "I Got My Pride"
 2001: "You and Me (Feels So Good)" (with Solar City)
 2002: "I Want You in My Life" (with Max Iron)
 2002: "I Pledge"
 2002: "Let's Runaway" (with Scott Michael)
 2002: "No More Drama" (with Mary J. Blige, Thunderpuss Club Anthem Mix)
 2003: "Happy New Year" (with Ernest Kohl)
 2003: "I Can't Stop"
 2003: "You're My Inspiration"
 2004: "Electro Illusion"
 2004: "Signed, Sealed, Delivered I'm Yours" (with Colton Ford) (cover of the Stevie Wonder song)
 2005: "Send Me an Angel" (cover of the Real Life song)
 2005: "Beauty Shop" (featured in the film Beauty Shop)
 2006: "Lost Yo Mind"
 2008: "Got to Give the People What They Want"
 2008: "Does Your Mother Know"
 2009: "Freeway of Love" (cover of the Aretha Franklin song)
 2009: "Burning" (with World of Colour)
 2011: "Love S.O.S."
 2011: "Things U Do"
 2012: "Our World" (with Clemens Rumpf)
 2013: "Dance Florr"

Session work appearances

 1989: Peter Frampton – When All the Pieces Fit
 1989: Lenny Kravitz – Let Love Rule
 1989: Cher – Heart of Stone
 1990: Lalah Hathaway – Lalah Hathaway
 1991: Michael Bolton – Time, Love & Tenderness
 1991: Neil Diamond – Lovescape
 1991: Cher – Love Hurts
 1991: Gladys Knight – Good Woman
 1991: Patti Austin – Carry On
 1992: Vonda Shepard – The Radical Light
 1992: Celine Dion – Celine Dion
 1992: Olivia Newton-John – Back To Basics
 1993: Tina Turner – What's Love Got To Do With It
 1993: Mick Jagger – Wandering Spirit
 1993: Celine Dion – The Colour of My Love
 1993: Texas – Ricks Road
 1993: Ray Charles – My World
 1993: Paul Rodgers – Muddy Water Blues: A Tribute to Muddy Waters
 1993: Bruce Hornsby – Harbor Lights
 1994: Victoria Williams – Loose
 1994: Phish – Hoist
 1994: Steve Perry – For the Love of Strange Medicine
 1994: Julio Iglesias – Crazy
 1995: Christopher Cross – Window
 1995: Haddaway – The Drive
 1995: Bobby Caldwell – Soul Survivor
 1995: Phyllis Hyman – I refuse To Be Lonely
 1996: Keb' Mo' – Just Like You
 1996: Celine Dion – Falling into You
 1997: Michael Lington – Michael Lington
 1997: Michael Bolton – All That Matters
 1998: CeCe Winans – His Gift
 2002: Solomon Burke – Don't Give Up On Me
 2003: Joe Henry – Tiny Voices
 2005: Bobby Caldwell – Perfect Island Nights
 2005: Susan Tedeschi – Hope And Desire
 2007: Evelyn "Champagne" King – Open Book
 2007: Tiffany – Just Me
 2007: Bob Dylan – I'm Not There
 2008: Rodney Crowell – Sex & Gasoline
 2009: Irma Thomas – The Soul Queen Of New Orleans
 2010: Aaron Neville – I Know I've Been Changed
 2010: Sheryl Crow – 100 Miles from Memphis
 2011: Hugh Laurie – Let Them Talk
 2012: Jimmy Cliff – Rebirth
 2013: Hugh Laurie – Didn't It Rain

See also
List of number-one dance hits (United States)
List of artists who reached number one on the U.S. Dance chart

References

External links

Pepper Mashay's label site on Myspace
Pepper Mashay fanpage

1953 births
20th-century African-American women
20th-century African-American people
21st-century African-American women
African-American women singer-songwriters
American house musicians
American pop musicians
American soul singers
American women in electronic music
Living people
People from Muncie, Indiana
UK garage singers
American session musicians